Conestoga Lake is a lake in Lancaster County, Nebraska, United States of America.   It is owned by the U.S. Army Corps of Engineers, with a recreation area.

References

Lakes of Nebraska
Bodies of water of Lancaster County, Nebraska